The 2001 Missouri Valley Conference men's soccer season was the 11th season of men's varsity soccer in the conference.

The 2001 Missouri Valley Conference Men's Soccer Tournament was hosted by the Missouri Valley Conference and won by SMU.

Teams

MVC Tournament

See also 

 Missouri Valley Conference
 Missouri Valley Conference men's soccer tournament
 2001 NCAA Division I men's soccer season
 2001 in American soccer

References 

Missouri Valley Conference
2001 NCAA Division I men's soccer season